Billal Miah (born 15 May 1960) is an Indian politician from Tripura. He is a former member of the Tripura Legislative Assembly from the Boxanagar (Vidhan Sabha constituency), having first been elected in the 1988 and 1998 elections. As of 2022, he is the working President of Tripura Pradesh Congress Committee and member of the INC.

Personal life
Billal Miah was born on 15 May 1960 in Sonamura to Maharam Ali and Sahara Begam. He did his schooling from NCI Institution, Sonamura, Tripura in 1981 and joined, University of Calcutta for further studies. He did his graduation in 1985 in political science from MBB college. Billal Miah married Nasreen Sultana on 16 December 1991. They have a son, Sabbir Ahammed Belali, and a daughter, Nusrat Jahan Sultana.

Political career
Billal Miah entered politics in 1979, as NSUI General Secretary, Sonamura Sub division. He served as Tripura Pradesh Youth Congress President, Sonamura Sub Division in 1983, State Youth Congress secretary 1985. In 1988, from Boxanagar (Vidhan Sabha constituency), Billa Miah was elected to the Tripura Legislative Assembly. He was appointed Minister of State for Agriculture, Fishery and Animal Resources, Planning Coordination, Flood Control. In 1991 he was appointed Cabinet Minister for Animal Resources, Labour and Employment Statistics.

In 1998, he was again elected as MLA from Boxanagar.

From 1998 to present day, the positions held by him in Tripura Pradesh Congress Committee include:
 Working President of Tripura Pradesh Congress Committee.
 Former President of Tripura Pradesh Youth Congress Committee
 Former General Secretary of Tripura Pradesh Congress Committee
 Former Vice President of Tripura Pradesh Congress Committee
 Former Chairman of Tripura Pradesh Congress Committee Minority Department, 2014.
 Former Sonamura District Congress President, Tripura Pradesh Congress Committee

References 

1960 births
Living people
Indian National Congress politicians from Tripura
Tripura MLAs 1998–2003
Tripura MLAs 1988–1993
People from Sipahijala district